Weissia controversa, the green-tufted stubble-moss, is a species of moss in the Pottiaceae family.

It is widely found in all continents, except in Antarctica.

Weissia controversa is a hermaphroditic species. The plants usually grow to less than 1 cm in height and the spores measure 14-20 µm.

References 

Pottiaceae
Taxobox binomials not recognized by IUCN